Ad-Damazin is the capital city of Blue Nile, Sudan. It is the location of the Roseires Dam and power generation plant.

Ad-Damazin is served by a terminal station of a branch line of the national railway network. However, the train service to Ad-Damazin has been discontinued many years ago. Instead the town can be reached from Khartoum via a decent tarmac road and by plane. However, Damazin Airport is mainly served by UNMIS or government flights. Ad-Damazin is a city filled with many dialects, but the majority of the population speaks Sudanese Arabic, which is an accent of the original Arabic language. The city lies west of the Nile river and northwest of the Roseires reservoir.

Blue Nile University (Jameat Al Neel Alazraq) is a public university located in Ad-Damazin, established in 1995.

Climate

Like other parts of the Sahel, Ad-Damazin has a hot semi-arid climate (Köppen climate classification BSh), with a wet season and a dry season and the temperature being hot year-round. The hottest time of year is from March to May, just before the wet season starts.

Ad-Damazin receives  of rain over 70.7 precipitation days, with a distinct wet and dry season like the rest of the Sahel. January receives no precipitation at all, and  almost no rain falls from November to March. July, the wettest month, receives  of rainfall on average. August has 16.9 precipitation days, which is the most of any month. Humidity is much higher in the wet season than the dry season, with March having a humidity at just 21% and August having a humidity at 79%. Ad-Damazin receives 3000.6 hours of sunshine annually on average, with the sunshine being distributed fairly evenly across the year, although it is lower during the wet season. January receives the most sunshine, while July receives the least.

See also 

 Railway stations in Sudan
 Al-Damazin Farms

References 

State capitals in Sudan
Populated places in Blue Nile (state)